Ortley is a cultivar of domesticated apple that originated in New Jersey. It has many other names including "Cleopatra" and "Jersey Greening". The fruit is similar to the Yellow Bellflower.

References

Apple cultivars